Minakshi Mukherjee is an Indian politician from West Bengal. She is the state secretary of the Democratic Youth Federation of India (DYFI). She previously was the state president of DYFI, the youth wing of CPIM. She was fielded as the Left Front candidate from Sanjukta Morcha against Chief Minister of West Bengal Mamata Banerjee and BJP Leader Suvendu Adhikari in the 2021 West Bengal Legislative Assembly Election from Nandigram, but lost to Suvendu Adhikari.

Early life 
Minakshi was born in Kulti, West Bengal. She completed schooling at Jaladhi Kumari Devi Uchcha Balika Vidyalaya in Kulti. Her graduation was from Banwarilal Bhalotia College Asansol and she later completed a master's degree in political science from Burdwan University.

Political career 
Minakshi Mukherjee started her activism through Students' Federation of India in her college days. She was later inducted into the Democratic Youth Federation of India (DYFI) local committee in 2008. Her leadership and public speaking skills helped her rise within DYFI, and by 2018, she became the state president of DYFI in West Bengal. In the same year, she also joined the state committee of the Communist Party of India (Marxist) in West Bengal.

In the 2021 West Bengal Legislative Assembly Election, she contested as the CPI(M) candidate in the high-profile constituency Nandigram, against the Trinamool Congress supremo Mamata Banerjee (the West Bengal Chief Minister) and the BJP candidate Suvendu Adhikari. Minakshi represented the Left-Congress-ISF alliance (Sanjukta Morcha) in Vidhan Sabha election.

On 11 February 2021, she participated in the 2021 Nabanna Abhijan from College Street to protest for jobs that was intended to present a list of demands to chief minister Mamata Banerjee at Nabanna, which ended with conflicting claims of how many protesters were hospitalized after the police responded, and prompted a 12-hour strike by the Left Front against police brutality. The injuries of the Nabanna protestors became a political issue in the upcoming election, and Mukherjee continued to emphasize the need for jobs in her campaign. However, she did not win the election.

On 5 October 2021, she became the first woman to serve as the state secretary of the Democratic Youth Federation of India.

References   

1984 births
Living people
University of Burdwan alumni
Women in West Bengal politics
Indian women activists
21st-century Indian women politicians
21st-century Indian politicians
Communist Party of India (Marxist) politicians from West Bengal